Edward Lucas (27 September 1787 – 12 November 1871) was an Irish landowner and politician in County Monaghan.

Biography
He was the only child of Charles Lucas, High Sheriff of Monaghan in 1795; Edward Lucas MP was his grandfather. In 1796 he succeeded his father in the family estate of Castle Shane. He was High Sheriff for Monaghan in 1818, and represented the county in Parliament from 1834 to 1841. From 1841 to 1846 he served as Under-Secretary for Ireland, and in 1845 he was appointed to the Irish Privy Council.

In 1812 Lucas was married to Anne, daughter of William Ruxton of Ardee. They had five sons (including Gould Arthur Lucas) and three daughters. On his death he was succeeded at Castle Shane by his eldest son Edward William; his widow died on 15 August 1880.

References

1787 births
1871 deaths
High Sheriffs of Monaghan
Irish Conservative Party MPs
Members of the Parliament of the United Kingdom for County Monaghan constituencies (1801–1922)
Members of the Privy Council of Ireland
UK MPs 1832–1835
UK MPs 1835–1837
UK MPs 1837–1841
Under-Secretaries for Ireland